The 1931–32 Divizia A was the twentieth season of Divizia A, the top-level football league of Romania.

Participating teams

Final Tournament of Regions

Preliminary round

Semifinals

Final
July 10, 1932, Bucharest

Champion squad

References

Liga I seasons
Romania
1931–32 in Romanian football